

Dopachrome tautomerase (dopachrome delta-isomerase, tyrosine-related protein 2), also known as DCT, is a human gene. Its expression is regulated by the microphthalmia-associated transcription factor (MITF).

See also 
 Tyrosinase-related protein 1 (TYRP1)
 Dopachrome, a cyclization product of L-DOPA and is an intermediate in the biosynthesis of melanin.

References

Further reading